Time Step is an album by American guitarist Leo Kottke, released in 1983.

History
Time Step is Kottke's last recording on the Chrysalis label. It is the first of two Kottke albums produced by T-Bone Burnett, the second being My Father's Face. Guests include Albert Lee and Emmylou Harris.

After the release of Time Step Kottke went into a three-year seclusion. When he returned later in 1986, it was as a guest musician on The Blind Leading the Naked by Violent Femmes, then his own releases with a new direction and picking style.

Time Step was re-issued on CD by BGO (CD255) in 1995.

Track listing
All songs by Leo Kottke except as noted.

Side one
 "Running All Night Long" – 2:44
 "The Bungle Party" – 3:00
 "Rings" (Eddie Reeves, Alex Harvey) – 2:53
 "Mr. Fonebone" – 2:05
 "Julie's House" – 3:24
 "Memories Are Made of This" (Frank Miller, Richard Dehr, Terry Gilkyson) – 2:38

Side two
 "Saginaw, Michigan" (Bill Anderson, Don Wayne) – 3:37
 "I'll Break Out Again" (Sanger D. Shafer, A.L. Owens) – 3:26
 "The Wrong Track" – 2:44
 "Starving" – 2:55
 "Here Comes That Rainbow Again" (Kris Kristofferson) – 3:11

Personnel
Leo Kottke - acoustic guitar, vocals
David Kemper - drums
David Miner - bass
Albert Lee - guitar on "Starving" and "Julies House", background vocals
Emmylou Harris - background vocals
Don Heffington - drums and percussion on "The Wrong Track"
Dennis Keely - percussion on "The Bungle Party" and "Running All Night Long"
Production notes:
Produced by T Bone Burnett
Engineered by Donivan Cowart
Second engineer: Alan Vashon

References

External links
 Leo Kottke's official site
 Unofficial Leo Kottke web site (fan site)

1983 albums
Leo Kottke albums
Albums produced by T Bone Burnett
Chrysalis Records albums